Corydon (Greek Κορύδων Korúdōn, probably related to κόρυδος kórudos "lark") is a stock name for a shepherd in ancient Greek pastoral poems and fables, such as the one in Idyll 4  of the Syracusan poet Theocritus (c. 300 – c. 250 BC).  The name was used by the Latin poets Siculus and, more significantly, Virgil.  In the second of Virgil's Eclogues, Corydon is a shepherd who loves a boy called Alexis. 

Corydon is the name of a character that features heavily in the Eclogues of Calpurnius Siculus. Some scholars believe that this Corydon represents Calpurnius himself, or at least his "poetic voice".

Corydon is mentioned in Edmund Spenser's The Faerie Queen as a shepherd in Book VI, Canto X.  In this section he is portrayed as a coward who fails to come to the aid of Pastorell when she is being pursued by a tiger.

The name appears in poem number 17 ("My flocks feed not, my ewes breed not") of The Passionate Pilgrim, an anthology of poetry first published in 1599 and attributed on the title page of the collection to Shakespeare. This poem appeared the following year in another collection, England's Helicon, where it was attributed to "Ignoto" (Latin for "Unknown"). Circumstantial evidence points to a possible authorship by Richard Barnfield, whose first published work, The Affectionate Shepherd, though dealing with the unrequited love of Daphnis for Ganymede, was in fact, as Barnfield stated later, an expansion of Virgil's second Eclogue which dealt with the love of Corydon for Alexis.

Corydon and Thyrsis appear in Henry Needler's poem, "A Pastoral", first published in 1724. 
 
Corydon is the name of a shepherd in a song titled “Pastoral Elegy”. The town of Corydon, Indiana is named after the shepherd of that song.

Corydon and Thyrsis are a pair of shepherds in Edna St. Vincent Millay's 1920 play Aria da Capo. 

Corydon is the title of a 1924 book by André Gide in the form of Socratic dialogues arguing for the naturalness and morality of homosexuality.

The name is again used for a shepherd boy in an English children's trilogy (Corydon and the Island of Monsters, Corydon and the Fall of Atlantis and Corydon and the Siege of Troy) by Tobias Druitt.

References

Virgil
Ancient Greek literature
Fictional LGBT characters in literature
LGBT themes in Greek mythology